The 1973 Giro d'Italia was the 56th edition of the Giro d'Italia, one of cycling's Grand Tours. The field consisted of 140 riders, and 113 riders finished the race.

By rider

By nationality

References

1973 Giro d'Italia
1973